Faleolo is a village on the island of Upolu in Samoa. The village is just south of Faleolo International Airport and is part of A'ano Alofi 4 Electoral Constituency (Faipule District) which forms part of the larger A'ana political district.

The population is 25.

References

Populated places in A'ana